Kim Ok-hui may refer to:
 Kim Ok-hui (volleyball)
 Kim Ok-hui (speed skater)